This is a videography of South Korean singer-songwriter and actor Kang Daniel. He has appeared in 26 music videos, various television shows, and has been featured in several commercials.

Music videos

2010s and 2020s

Guest appearances

Other videos

Video albums

Live video albums

Other video albums
 Hello, Daniel Travel Story in Portland & LA DVD
 Never Standing Still

Filmography

Television

Web series

Web shows

Hosting

Exhibitions

Commercials

References

External links 
 
 

Videography
Videographies of South Korean artists